Norman Zenos McLeod (September 20, 1898 – January 27, 1964) was an American film director, screenwriter and cartoonist.

McLeod's most acclaimed work was made in collaboration with major comic performers of the 1930s, and included such films as the first original Marx Brothers comedies Monkey Business (1931) and Horse Feathers (1932), the most acclaimed W.C. Fields film It's a Gift (1934), the Danny Kaye vehicle The Secret Life of Walter Mitty (1947), and The Paleface starring Bob Hope (1948). He also directed the first two installments of theTopper franchise.

Other significant films McLeod made include Taking a Chance (1928), Alice in Wonderland (1933), Pennies from Heaven (1936), There Goes My Heart (1938), Merrily We Live (1938),  Little Men (1940), Panama Hattie (1942), Jackass Mail (1942), and his last, Alias Jesse James (1959). In his later years, McLeod was recruited by writer Rod Serling to direct silent film comedy legend Buster Keaton in the 1961 Richard Matheson-penned "Once Upon a Time" episode of Serling's classic CBS television series The Twilight Zone.

Personal life
He was educated at the University of Washington and spent two years as a fighter pilot in the Army Air Service in France during World War I. He was married to Evelyn Ward, whom he married in 1926, until his death on January 26, 1964, from a stroke at age 65. McLeod was buried in the Court of Freedom courtyard at Forest Lawn Memorial Park in Glendale, California.

On February 8, 1960, he received a star on the Hollywood Walk of Fame, for his contributions to the motion pictures industry at 1724 Vine Street.

References

External links

1898 births
1964 deaths
American cartoonists
People from Greater Los Angeles
People from Grayling, Michigan
University of Washington alumni
Film directors from Michigan
Film directors from California
Burials at Forest Lawn Memorial Park (Glendale)